Over the Top to Victory, also known as Doughboy Statue and Their Country's Call Answered, is an outdoor bronze sculpture by John Paulding, formerly located at the Marion County Courthouse in Salem, Oregon, United States. The statue was commissioned by the American War Mothers and the Gold Star Mothers Club to commemorate the 87 men and one woman from Marion County who died in World War I.

Description
The bronze sculpture depicts a uniformed World War I soldier, running and holding a gun with a bayonet in his proper left hand and a grenade in his opposite hand. He is shown wearing a backpack and hat.

An inscription on the lower right reads: . On the front of the base is the inscription: . The base's front also includes a plaque with a signed founder's mark and the text: . Displayed on the other three sides of the base are the names of 87 men and one woman from Marion County who died in the war.

History

John Paulding's Over the Top to Victory was commissioned by the American War Mothers and the Gold Star Mothers Club to commemorate the 88 people from Marion County who died in World War I. The statue was copyrighted in 1920 and dedicated at the Marion County Courthouse on November 11, 1924. It was moved to its current location in May 1991 by the Oregon Department of Veterans' Affairs and rededicated on May 18, 1991. The sculpture was surveyed and considered "treatment needed" by the Smithsonian Institution's "Save Outdoor Sculpture!" program in May 1993, and was still administered by the  Department of Veterans' Affairs then.

See also
 1924 in art
 Astoria Victory Monument

References

External links
 

1924 establishments in Oregon
1924 sculptures
Bronze sculptures in Oregon
Monuments and memorials in Salem, Oregon
Outdoor sculptures in Salem, Oregon
Sculptures of men in Oregon
Statues in Oregon
World War I memorials in the United States